Evrard Godefroid (29 June 1932 – 31 December 2013) was a Belgian cyclist. He competed in the time trial and sprint events at the 1956 Summer Olympics.

References

1932 births
2013 deaths
Belgian male cyclists
Olympic cyclists of Belgium
Cyclists at the 1956 Summer Olympics
People from Binche
Cyclists from Hainaut (province)